Kanavis McGhee (born October 4, 1968) is a former American football linebacker and defensive end. He is a former defensive linemen coach with the Amsterdam Admirals in NFL Europa. He coached as the defensive line coach at the University of Colorado-Boulder in Boulder, Colorado. He is currently the head coach and athletic coordinator at Sterling High School in Houston, Texas.

McGhee was a business student while attending the University of Colorado. He studied business with an emphasis in marketing.

Kanavis McGhee attended Phillis Wheatley High School in Houston and played college football at Colorado. During his career at Colorado, McGhee was one of the top defenders in college football, earning him first-team All-Big Eight honors, a finalist nomination for the prestigious Dick Butkus Award and runner-up for the Rotary Lombardi Award. Both awards are given annually to top linebackers in college football.

Kanavis was drafted in the second round (55th overall) of the 1991 NFL Draft, as defensive end by the New York Giants, where he played for three seasons until he suffered a left knee injury in August 1993 and the Giants released him in May 1994. After this he joined the Cincinnati Bengals as free agent before returning to his hometown to play with the Houston Oilers for the season of 1995.

McGhee gained coaching experience while serving as head coach of Ross Shaw Sterling High School in Houston, Texas. In 2006, he spent the season with the Amsterdam Admirals as defensive assistant, participating in the NFL Europa coaching program. In 2007 McGhee returned for a second season and tutored the Admirals' defensive linemen.

McGhee worked as a teacher at Challenge Early College High School in Houston, Texas. In 2010 he returned to Colorado as defensive line assistant under Jon Embree.

McGhee has two sons, Davyon McGhee, who played for Kansas State University, also as linebacker, and Kendall Gregory-McGhee, who played for the University of Minnesota as a defensive end.

Agent Allegations
In the October 18, 2010 issue of Sports Illustrated, former NFL agent Josh Luchs alleges that he gave McGhee $2,500 while trying to persuade him to hire Luchs as his agent, while he still played for the University of Colorado. Luchs said McGhee told him his mother was about to be evicted from her rental home and needed the money. According to Luchs, McGhee never paid back the money and did not return his phone calls. If true, the payment would have been considered a major violation of NCAA rules regarding player eligibility. Kanavis McGhee has denied that he ever violated NCAA rules and Alfred Williams, who was present at first meeting between McGhee and Luchs, has stated that the information in the article is not true.

References

External Links
 1991 NFL Draft NFL.com
 McGhee to Have Knee Surgery New York Times August 4, 1993
 After 3 Years, McGhee Can't Cut It for Giants New York Times May 11, 1994
 Bengals Sign McGhee, a Former Giant New York Times July 8, 1994
 Past Winners - 1989 The Rotary Lombardi Award 
 Kanavis Mcghee's stats databaseFootball.com
 Biography Davyon McGhee Kansas State, July 6, 2006

1968 births
Living people
Players of American football from Houston
American football linebackers
Colorado Buffaloes football players
American football defensive ends
New York Giants players
Cincinnati Bengals players
Houston Oilers players
Amsterdam Admirals coaches